Gisle Saga is a Norwegian music producer and songwriter.

Career

Early work
Gisle Saga  (born May 9, 1974) had two major hits on the Norwegian chart VG-lista with the band El More. "Everybody" reached no 9 and "Close to you" reached no 2. "Close to you" was the official Norwegian Big Brother theme of the 2002 season.

Present
Gisle Saga is running the music production company Privilege Production.

References

External links
Privilege Production

1974 births
Living people
Norwegian musicians
Norwegian record producers
Norwegian songwriters
21st-century Norwegian singers